Alexandra Veronica Mochary Kasser (born May 4, 1967) is an American politician, attorney and advocate who served as a member of the Connecticut State Senate for the 36th district from 2019 to 2021. Connecticut's 36th district covers Greenwich and parts of Stamford and New Canaan. She is a member of the Democratic Party and was the first Democrat to be elected to this seat since 1933.

Early life and education 
Born in Chicago, Illinois, Kasser was raised in Montclair, New Jersey and is the daughter of Mary Mochary and Judge Stephen E. Mochary (d. 2001) . She is the sister of Matt Mochary.

Kasser received her bachelor's degree from Wesleyan University in 1988. In 1993, she received a Juris Doctor from University of Chicago Law School a Masters in Environmental Law and Policy from Yale University in 2014. In that same year, Kasser became a candidate for a PhD at Yale University.

Career 
Kasser practiced corporate law at the firm of Skadden Arps Slate Meagher & Flom.

In the 2018 election, Kasser, a political newcomer, defeated five-term Republican incumbent, Scott Frantz, becoming the first Democrat to represent Greenwich in the State Senate since 1930, and the first Democrat to win the 36th Senate district since 1933. Kasser won by about 600 votes. In 2020, Kasser won re-election by a margin of about 1,100 votes.

Kasser's committee assignments included Vice Chair of the Judiciary Committee, Chair of the Banking Committee, Vice Chair of the Transportation Committee, and membership on the Environment Committee, Public Health Committee, Legislative Regulation and Review Committee and the Executive and Legislative Nominations Committee. She was also a Deputy Majority Leader of the Senate.

In the State Senate, Kasser led a failed effort to re-install tolls on Connecticut's state highways, and create an Infrastructure Bank in Connecticut. Kasser introduced a bill providing tax credits to employers who make payments on employee's student loans. An amended version of the bill was passed in the State Senate in May 2019, and signed into law by governor Ned Lamont the following month.

Kasser was a proponent Paid Family Medical Leave, a living Minimum Wage, and eliminating the state’s estate tax.

Kasser was the State Senator who introduced Jennifers’ Law, a ground-breaking law that redefines domestic violence to include coercive control. The law includes multiple protections for victims of domestic violence and their children, including the ability to access free legal help, change locks in rental units and apply for restraining orders if they’ve experienced coercive control. In a section that addresses custody matters, the law adds “physical and emotional safety of the child” as the first factor to be considered by judges and Guardian Ad Litems. They must also consider “the effect on the child of the actions of an abuser if any domestic violence, as defined in 46b1 (which now includes coercive control) has occurred between the parents." Jennifers’ Law is named in honor of Jennifer Dulos, a New Canaan woman living in Kasser's district, who disappeared after a dispute with her husband, Fotis Dulos, and Jennifer Magnano, who was shot and killed by her husband in front of her children.

Divorce and resignation 
On June 22, 2021, Kasser announced her resignation from public office, saying that her ability to do her job was impeded by ongoing divorce litigation with Seth Bergstein.

She was succeeded by Republican Ryan Fazio.

Personal life 
After filing for divorce, Kasser began dating her current partner, Nichola Samponaro, a political consultant and Realtor who grew up in Greenwich, CT. Samponaro volunteered as Kasser’s 2018 and 2020 campaign manager and briefly worked as her Chief of Staff in 2018.

Non-profit involvement 
From 2012-2016 Kasser was Chairman of the Mount Sinai Children's Environmental Health Center board, an organization dedicated to advancing research on the environmental and epigenetic causes of children’s diseases including cancer. Kasser is the founder of The Parity Partnership, a non-profit dedicated to advancing gender equality in the public and private sectors. She was also Chairman of Greenwich Community Gardens and has served on various boards dedicated to helping children, such as Kids in Crisis.

References

External links 
 Official website 
 Campaign website
 Bills introduced

Democratic Party Connecticut state senators
Living people
Women state legislators in Connecticut
1967 births
Lesbian politicians
LGBT lawyers
LGBT people from Connecticut
LGBT people from Illinois
LGBT state legislators in Connecticut
Politicians from Chicago
University of Chicago Law School alumni
Wesleyan University alumni
Yale University alumni
21st-century LGBT people
21st-century American women